Sir Steuart Spencer Davis, CMG (1875 – 3 April 1950) was a British colonial administrator. He was Governor of Saint Helena from 1932 to 1937.

After being called to the English bar by Gray's Inn in 1905, Davis served in St Kitts, the Gold Coast, Tanganyika, and Palestine before becoming Governor of Saint Helena in 1932. As governor, he named Jonathan the tortoise, currently the oldest known living land animal.

References 
 https://www.ukwhoswho.com/view/10.1093/ww/9780199540891.001.0001/ww-9780199540884-e-224536

British colonial governors and administrators in Africa
Governors of Saint Helena
1875 births
1950 deaths
Companions of the Order of St Michael and St George
People educated at Dean Close School
Members of Gray's Inn
British people in the British West Indies
British people in the British Gold Coast
British expatriates in Tanganyika
British people in Mandatory Palestine